Wanna Buakaew (RTGS: Wanna Buakaeo, born January 2, 1981) is a  retired Thai volleyball player, and currently coach. She has represented Thailand 44 times in international volleyball competitions.

Clubs

As a volleyball player
  Pepsi Bangkok (1999–2002)
  Johnson Matthey Spezzano (2002–2003)
  Igtisadchi Baku (2009–2010)
  Nong Khai (2010–2011)
  Nakornnonthaburi (2011–2012)
  Igtisadchi Baku (2012–2014)
  Idea Khonkaen (2014–2015)
  Azerrail Baku (2015–2016)
  Allianz MTV Stuttgart (2016–2017)
  Bangkok Glass (2017–2018)

As a coach
  Nakhon Ratchasima (2018–2019)

Awards

Individual
 2007 Asian Club Championship "Best Digger"
 2007 Asian Championship "Best Digger"
 2008 Asian Cup Championship "Best Libero"
 2009 Asian Club Championship "Best Libero"
 2009 Asian Championship "Best Libero"
 2009-10 Azerbaijan Super League "Best Receiver"
 2010–11 Thailand League "Best Digger"
 2011–12 Thailand League "Most Valuable Player"
 2011–12 Thailand League "Best Libero"
 2011–12 Thailand League "Best Receiver"
 2014–15 Thailand League "Best Libero"

Clubs 
 2007 Asian Club Championship -  Runner-Up, with Sang Som
 2009 Asian Club Championship -   Champion, with Federbrau
 2011–12 Thailand League -  Champion, with Nakornnonthaburi
 2012 Asian Club Championship -  Bronze medal, with Chang
 2012 Princess's Cup -  Champion, with PEA Sisaket
 2012-13 Azerbaijan Super League -  Runner-Up, with Igtisadchi Baku
 2013 Princess's Cup -  Champion, with PEA Sisaket
 2015–16 Azerbaijan Super League –  Champion, with Azerrail Baku
 2018 Thai-Denmark Super League -  Runner-up, with Bangkok Glass

Royal decorations 
 2013 -  Commander (Third Class) of The Most Exalted Order of the White Elephant
 2010 -  Commander (Third Class) of The Most Admirable Order of the Direkgunabhorn

References

External links

1981 births
Living people
Wanna Buakaew
Volleyball players at the 2002 Asian Games
Volleyball players at the 2006 Asian Games
Igtisadchi Baku volleyball players
Thai expatriate sportspeople in Azerbaijan
Wanna Buakaew
Wanna Buakaew
Wanna Buakaew
Southeast Asian Games medalists in volleyball
Universiade medalists in volleyball
Competitors at the 2001 Southeast Asian Games
Competitors at the 2003 Southeast Asian Games
Competitors at the 2005 Southeast Asian Games
Competitors at the 2007 Southeast Asian Games
Competitors at the 2009 Southeast Asian Games
Competitors at the 2011 Southeast Asian Games
Competitors at the 2013 Southeast Asian Games
Competitors at the 2015 Southeast Asian Games
Medalists at the 2001 Summer Universiade
Universiade bronze medalists for Thailand
Wanna Buakaew
Wanna Buakaew
Wanna Buakaew
Wanna Buakaew
Thai expatriate sportspeople in Italy
Thai expatriate sportspeople in Germany
Expatriate volleyball players in Azerbaijan
Expatriate volleyball players in Germany
Expatriate volleyball players in Italy